Wolfsbane may refer to:

Plants
 Aconitum, a genus of toxic flowering plants of the northern hemisphere
 Aconitum lycoctonum or northern wolfsbane
 Arnica montana, a toxic European flowering plant

Arts and entertainment
 Wolfsbane (band), an English heavy metal/hard rock band
 Wolfsbane (album), 1994
 Wolfsbane (comics), a Marvel Comics superhero
 Wolfsbane (novel), a 2003 Doctor Who novel by Jacqueline Rayner
 Wolfbane (novel), a 1959 novel by Frederik Pohl and C. M. Kornbluth
Wolfbane, a 2022 novel by Michelle Paver
Wolfsbane, a 1978 novel by Craig Thomas
 Wolf's Bane, a 1993 fantasy book set in the Lone Wolf universe
 Sir Peter Wolf's-Bane, a title Aslan gives to Peter Pevensie in C.S. Lewis' The Lion, the Witch and the Wardrobe novel after he kills Maugrim, a talking wolf.